The Son of Captain Blood is a 1962 Italian/Spanish/American international co-production film. It is the first starring role in a film for Sean Flynn, the son of Errol Flynn, who played the title character in the 1935 film Captain Blood. The film was released in Great Britain in 1963 by Warner-Pathe (in some regions on a double bill with Hammer's The Scarlet Blade). Paramount Pictures released the film in the U.S. in 1964 on a double bill with the Jerry Lewis film The Patsy.

Plot
Robert Blood, son of the great Captain Peter Blood, is restless to go to sea when his mother finally gives her consent. Robert is assigned a ship. On board he meets a beautiful young damsel named Abigail. At sea their ship is attacked by the pirate, Malagon, and they are taken prisoner. Malagon is an old enemy of Captain Blood and delights in mistreating Robert. With the help of some of Captain Blood's former shipmates, who are now part of Malagon's crew, Robert takes over Malagon's ship. Now captain of a pirate ship, Robert and his crew come across a slaver ship and rescue some of Robert's servants who have been taken to be sold as slaves. Robert and his men return to his native Jamaica to battle the corrupt authorities. As Robert and his crew win their fight, the 1692 Jamaica earthquake and tidal wave strike the island. Robert and his men rescue his mother and others trapped in a church in Port Royal. They all survive. In the aftermath, Robert and Abigail are set to marry and live happily ever after.

Cast
 Sean Flynn as Robert Blood
 Alessandra Panaro as Abigail 'Abby' McBride
 John Kitzmiller as Moses
 José Nieto as Capitan De Malagon
 Roberto Camardiel as Oliver Orguelthorpe
 Fernando Sancho as Timothy Thomas
 Ann Todd as Arabella Blood

Production
Flynn tested for the role in May 1961 and the film was announced in September. Harry Joe Brown originally announced  Casey Robinson would write and Nathan Juran would direct, but the film was directed by Argentine born Spanish director, Tulio Demicheli.

Several scenes were shot around the Dénia harbour in Spain respectively the Gulf of Valencia. Before leaving for Spain, Flynn enlisted stuntman and fellow actor Jock Mahoney who frequently stunt doubled for his father Errol to teach him how to fight, fence, and fall safely and convincingly on screen.

Reception
"The old magic isn't there" said the Los Angeles Times.

Biography

References

External links
 
 
 
 
 Story of the Making of the film at Histories de Tournages

1962 films
American historical adventure films
Italian historical adventure films
Spanish historical adventure films
1960s historical adventure films
Films set in Jamaica
English-language Italian films
English-language Spanish films
Films directed by Tulio Demicheli
Films set in the 1690s
Paramount Pictures films
Films scored by Gregorio García Segura
1960s English-language films
1960s American films
1960s Italian films